That Girl Montana is an extant 1921 American silent Western film starring Blanche Sweet and distributed by Pathé Exchange. Jesse D. Hampton produced and Robert Thornby directed. The film is based on a 1901 novel, That Girl Montana, by Marah Ellis Ryan. This is one of Sweet's few 1920s silent films to survive and is available in the DVD format.

Plot
As summarized in a film publication, Montana Rivers (Sweet) finally escapes her father who had forced her to wear men's clothing and help in robbing and cheating. She is taken in by friendly Indians and stays at their camp. Later, Akkomi (Edler), chief of the tribe, asks his friend Dan Overton to take the girl as it is not good for her to remain in the camp. Dan provides for "Tana" and falls in love with her but, because of her past, she keeps him at a distance. Jim Harris comes by and recognizes Tana as the boy robber, but when he attempts to blacken her past, Dan gives him a beating which paralyzes him. Jim then stays on with Dan, who regrets his hastiness. Eventually Tana's father appears and demands that Tana go away with him. She refuses but also does not tell Dan of this trouble. Meanwhile, Jim has waited to avenge himself against Tana's father, who previously had run off with Jim's wife and baby. When Tana's outlaw father appears, Jim, whose arms are still strong, strangles him. Jim tells Tana that she is his daughter, the child of the wife who had run away. The film ends with Tana and Dan embracing.

Cast
 Blanche Sweet as Montana Rivers
 Mahlon Hamilton as Dan Overton
 Frank Lanning as Jim Harris
 Edward Peil, Sr. as Lee Holly
 Charles Edler as Akkomi
 Claire Du Brey as Lottie
 Kate Price as Mrs Huzzard
 Jack Roseleigh as Max Lyster

See also
 Blanche Sweet filmography

References

External links
 
 

1921 films
1921 Western (genre) films
American black-and-white films
Films based on American novels
Films directed by Robert Thornby
Pathé Exchange films
Silent American Western (genre) films
Films with screenplays by George H. Plympton
1920s American films